In mathematical analysis, Trudinger's theorem or the Trudinger inequality (also sometimes called the Moser–Trudinger inequality) is a result of functional analysis on Sobolev spaces. It is named after Neil Trudinger (and Jürgen Moser).

It provides an inequality between a certain Sobolev space norm and an Orlicz space norm of a function. The inequality is a limiting case of Sobolev imbedding and can be stated as the following theorem:

Let  be a bounded domain in  satisfying the cone condition. Set

Then there exists the embedding

where 

The space 

 

is an example of an Orlicz space.

References

. 
.

Sobolev spaces
Inequalities
Theorems in analysis